Vodný Hrad is a smaller water castle in Štítnik, Slovakia.

Location 

The ruins are located in a park, not far from a local church. Štítnik is about 14 km from Rožňava.

History 

The castle was first constructed in the 14th century. 

Around 1559, the castle's protective walls surrounding the castle underwent a reconstruction to better ward off enemies from attempting to capture the village or the castle. The castle belonged to several families including the Balog, Pongrác and Bakošov families. 

At the beginning of the 19th century, a part of the castle was remodeled into a more period manor house.

References 

Castles in Slovakia
Buildings and structures in Košice Region
Water castles